Nebria pindarica is a species of ground beetle in the Nebriinae subfamily that is endemic to Uttar Pradesh province of India.

References

pindarica
Beetles described in 1926
Beetles of Asia
Endemic fauna of Uttar Pradesh